Gori Fortress ("Goris Tsikhe") is a medieval citadel in Georgia, situated above the city of Gori on a rocky hill.

Standing on the hilltop, the fortress's outlines follow the natural relief, hence the irregular shape. The inner fortifications occupy the entire plateau, from which the walls descend towards the road along the western slope. Originally, the walls reached the river below and the water had to be diverted through a tunnel, but the river has retreated since.

The fortress first appears in records from the 13th century, but archaeological evidence shows that the area had already been fortified in the final centuries BCE. The fortress was of major strategic importance, given its dominant position guarding a regional trade route, and accommodated a large garrison. In the 16th century the Ottomans captured it to overawe Tbilisi. In 1598 the Georgians, led by their king Simon I, besieged it for nine months to no avail; in 1599 they feigned relieving the siege for Lent and then launched a surprise night attack to regain control over the citadel. The fortress continued to change hands between the Georgians and the Persians in the 17th century.

The citadel acquired its present-day form under the Georgian kings Rostom of Kartli in the 1630s and Erekle II in 1774. Following its completion, King Rostom asked the Italian missionary Cristophoro Castelli, who lived in Gori, to draw the fortress. His stunning illustration from approximately 1642 is a valuable historical document. After the Russian annexation of Georgia in 1801, the fortress was garrisoned by a Russian grenadier battalion, but its importance gradually declined and the fortifications went defunct. The city plan of 1824 shows the citadel, the city on the hill slopes and a moat encircling both. The British Encyclopædia Metropolitana reported in 1845:

Gori Fortress was significantly damaged by an earthquake in 1920. The best preserved structure is Tskhra-kara ("the Nine-gated"), facing to the west and adjoined by supplementary walls on the south and east.

Gallery

References 

Castles and forts in Georgia (country)
Buildings and structures in Gori, Georgia
Tourist attractions in Shida Kartli